Sudarat Chuchuen (born 19 June 1997) is a Thai footballer who plays as a defender for Sisaket FC and the Thailand women's national team.

She was selected for the 2019 FIFA Women's World Cup.

International goals

References

External links

1997 births
Living people
Women's association football defenders
Sudarat Chuchuen
Sudarat Chuchuen
2019 FIFA Women's World Cup players
Sudarat Chuchuen
Footballers at the 2018 Asian Games
Sudarat Chuchuen